Eric Sydney Zana (born ) is a South African professional rugby union player who last played for in the Currie Cup and in the Rugby Challenge. His regular position is fly-half or fullback.

Career

Youth and amateur rugby

Zana played predominantly club rugby for George-based Progress until 2009, although he was part of the  squad for the 2008 Under-18 Provincial Championship.

SWD Eagles

In 2010, Zana was one of ten club players identified by  Johann Lerm and was included in their squad for the 2010 Vodacom Cup competition. He started the first four of the SWD Eagles' fixtures in the competition, scoring 26 points.

Zana's contribution was deemed enough to also warrant his inclusion in the SWD Eagles' squad for the 2010 Currie Cup First Division season. Zana played off the bench for the entire season, making eleven appearances in their twelve matches, as the Eagles finished top of the log during the pool stages. He also played in both legs of the promotion/relegation play-offs, but could not prevent the SWD Eagles losing 65–54 on aggregate over two legs to remain in the First Division.

Zana once again returned for the 2011 Vodacom Cup season, making six appearances for the SWD Eagles.

Boland Cavaliers

In May 2011, Zana moved to the Western Cape where he joined club side Belhar. He was subsequently included in the  side for the 2012 Currie Cup First Division season. After playing off the bench twice, he then started in ten consecutive matches for the Cavaliers in the run-in of the season, scoring 22 points in the process, but couldn't help them qualify for the semi-finals. He was also included in the Boland Cavaliers sevens side that played at the 2012 7s Premier League in Zana's hometown, George.

Zana missed the 2013 Vodacom Cup competition through a shoulder injury, but returned for the 2013 Currie Cup First Division, where he contributed 65 points in thirteen appearances to finish as the Cavaliers' top points scorer in the competition and ninth overall.

Griquas

Zana joined Kimberley-based side  for the 2016 season.

References

South African rugby union players
Living people
1987 births
People from George, South Africa
Rugby union fly-halves
Rugby union fullbacks
Boland Cavaliers players
SWD Eagles players
Rugby union players from the Western Cape